Philippe Vasset (born 1972) is a French novelist and journalist. He is the editor in chief of the investigative newsletters Africa Energy Intelligence and Intelligence Online, published by Indigo Publications press group. He worked as a corporate detective in the United States before becoming a journalist and, in 1993, won the prize of Best Young Writer awarded by the French daily Le Monde. Following his debut ScriptGenerator®™ (2004), he has already written a second novel.

References

1972 births
Living people
20th-century French novelists
21st-century French novelists
French male novelists
20th-century French male writers
21st-century French male writers